Dubinin, or Dubinina (feminine; Дубинина), is a Russian surname. Notable people with the surname include:

Eduard Dubinin, Russian astrophysicist
6359 Dubinin, an asteroid named after him
Mikhail Dubinin, Russian chemist, academician
Nicolai Dubinin (born 1973), Russian Roman Catholic prelate
Nikolay Dubinin (1907–1998), Russian biologist, academician
, former chair of the Central Bank of the Russian Federation
Valentin Dubinin (b. 1946), former acting governor of Primorsky Krai, Russia
Vasily Dubinin (1920–1979), a Soviet army officer and Hero of the Soviet Union
Vitaly Dubinin, bass guitarist of Aria
Vladimir Dubinin, Soviet hero pioneer, defender of Kerch during the Battle of the Kerch Peninsula
Yuri Dubinin (1930–2013), Russian diplomat

Russian-language surnames